Vice Admiral Donald Bruce Chalmers,  (born 29 April 1942) is a retired senior commander of the Royal Australian Navy (RAN), who served as Chief of Navy from 1997 to 1999.

Early life
Chalmers was born on 29 April 1942 in Young, New South Wales, to Donald Lisle Chalmers and Constance (née Eagles).

Career
Chalmers joined the RAN in 1958 and chose to specialise in navigation. He was awarded the National Medal in 1977. In 1988, he attended the Royal College of Defence Studies in the United Kingdom. He was appointed as an Officer of the Order of Australia in 1992 in recognition of his services as Commander of the first Royal Australian Navy Task Group during the Gulf War. He was appointed Maritime Commander Australia in December 1993, Assistant Chief of Defence Force responsible for Australian Defence Force development and international defence relationships in April 1995, and finally Chief of Navy in July 1997. He was awarded the Legion of Merit by the United States Government in 1998 and retired in July 1999.

Notes

References
 

1942 births
Graduates of the Royal College of Defence Studies
Australian military personnel of the Gulf War
Australian military personnel of the Indonesia–Malaysia confrontation
Military personnel from New South Wales
Chiefs of Navy (Australia)
Commanders of the Legion of Merit
Graduates of Britannia Royal Naval College
Living people
Naval War College alumni
Officers of the Order of Australia
People from Young, New South Wales
Royal Australian Navy admirals